Ipswich Airport  was an airfield on the outskirts of Ipswich, Suffolk England. It was known as RAF Nacton when No. 3619 Fighter Control Unit of the Royal Auxiliary Air Force were based there.

History
The site of Ravens Wood  was purchased by the Ipswich Corporation in 1929 with the intention of creating a municipal airport for Ipswich, with construction starting in the following year. The airport was officially opened by Prince Edward on 26 June 1930, who described the facility as "one of the finest in the country".

In February 1936 the airfield was taken over by the Straight Corporation. They formed Ipswich Airport Ltd to manage it and took over Ipswich Aero Club which was already established at the airfield. The corporation's architects, Henning and Chitty, designed a new terminal building which was opened on 9 May 1938, with an official opening ceremony on 9 July. The building was Grade 2 listed in 1996; having been described as "very rare and early example of this type of construction".

Southern Airways, another Straight company, operated routes to Clacton and to Ramsgate and Ilford, with a request stop at Southend, mainly using Short Scion aircraft. 

In 1938 the Aero Club expanded its training role by taking part in the Civil Air Guard scheme, and on 3 July 1939 No. 37 Elementary and Reserve Flying Training school (E&RFTS) was set up here.

Straight Corporation established an engine workshop in 1939, which worked for their own fleet and also took on outside work.

After the Second World War the airport offered scheduled flights to Southend and Jersey by Channel Airways and later to Amsterdam and Manchester by Suckling Airways. A number of chartered flights were operated by air taxi firm, Hawk Air.

From its earliest days, the airport was home to a wide variety of privately owned and flying club operated aircraft. Aircraft maintenance services were provided in the 1930-built hangar by a succession of based aviation engineering firms. In the 1980s it was home to a thriving parachuting club.

Military

The following units were posted here at some point:

Closure
The council, who owned the site, commissioned a development report in 1990 for the site. On the basis of its findings which determined better use of the site for development the Council decided to close the airfield in 1993. This announcement signalled the start of the campaigns to keep the airport operating as such, and it was thought the airport had been saved when the council allowed businesses to stay in operation with rolling leases, and projects to upgrade the air traffic control systems in September 1996.

The airfield was delicensed and ceased to be registered by the Civil Aviation Authority on 31 December 1996. Not through lack of use, nor through public pressure; following the announcement of intention to close by Ipswich Borough Council in late September 1996, there were petitions to keep the site as an operating airport, this culminated with a sit-in which started on 1 January 1997; the last aircraft left over a year later in January 1998

The site has since been redeveloped as the Ravenswood housing estate; the Grade II listed terminal building was partly demolished to facilitate its conversion into a community centre and flats by Ashwell Property Group. Externally, the building retains some resemblance to the original building.

References

Citations

Bibliography

  John Myerscough, "Airport Provision in the Inter-War Years", Journal of Contemporary History 20 (1985) pp. 41–70

External links

 Ipswich Airport Association
 Ipswich Transport Museum
 Risky Buildings

Defunct airports in England
Grade II listed buildings in Ipswich
Airports established in 1930
Airports disestablished in 1998
1930 establishments in England
1998 disestablishments in England
Transport in Ipswich
Grade II listed airports
Airports in the East of England